Madonna and Child is an oil on panel painting by Cima da Conegliano, from 1504, now in the Museo nazionale atestino in Este. It is very similar to the same artist's Uffizi Madonna. It is the most important pictorial work in the museum, since it is mainly dedicated to archeology.

The work is very similar to Uffizi Madonna, also dated from 1504. The position of the Madonna in this painting recalls the paintings by Giovanni Bellini (Madonna with Child and the Saints Catherine and Mary Magdalene) and is very similar to that of the other nineteen Madonnas of the artist.

References

1504 paintings
Este
Paintings in Veneto